The 1991 Skate Canada International was held in London, Ontario on October 24–27. Medals were awarded in the disciplines of men's singles, ladies' singles, pair skating, and ice dancing.

Results

Men

Ladies

Pairs

Ice dancing

References

Skate Canada International, 1991
Skate Canada International
1991 in Canadian sports
1991 in Ontario